Yana Unu (Quechua yana black, unu water, "black water") is a mountain in the Andes of Bolivia which reaches a height of approximately . Yana Unu lies west of a valley named Jatun Q'asa ("big valley"). Its intermittent stream flows to the Caiti River.

References 

Mountains of Potosí Department